Double J or Double Jay may refer to:

Double Jay, the former name of Australian radio station Triple J
Double J (radio station), the Triple J-run rebranding of radio station Dig Music
Double-J stent, a ureteric stent used in urology
Double-J (manga), a comedy manga by Eiji Nonaka
Double Jay (horse), an American Thoroughbred racehorse
Double J, ring name of professional wrestler Jeff Jarrett

See also 
JJ (disambiguation)